James Otis McCrery III (born September 18, 1949) is an American lawyer, politician and lobbyist who served as a Republican member of the United States House of Representatives from 1988 to 2009. He represented the 4th District of Louisiana, based in the north-western quadrant of the state.

McCrery was a ranking member on the House Ways and Means Committee. Had the Republicans maintained control of the U.S. House in 2007, he would have been in line to chair the Ways and Means Committee. Instead, the slot went to the veteran Democrat Charles Rangel of Harlem in New York City. He was also a member of the Executive Committee of the National Republican Congressional Committee and the Republican Main Street Partnership, a group of Moderate Republicans.

McCrery did not seek reelection in 2008 and was replaced as Representative by John C. Fleming, a fellow Republican.

Early life and career

McCrery was born in Shreveport and reared in Leesville, the seat of Vernon Parish in western Louisiana. He graduated in 1967 from Leesville High School. In 1971, McCrery earned a Bachelor of Arts degree in both English and history from Louisiana Tech University in Ruston in Lincoln Parish. Thereafter in 1975, he obtained a degree from the Louisiana State University Paul M. Hebert Law Center in Baton Rouge. McCrery joined the law firm of Jackson, Smith & Ford in Leesville, where he worked from 1975 to 1978.

From January through August 1979, he was a staff member of U.S. Representative Buddy Leach, a Leesville native. McCrery resigned from Rep. Leach's staff in August 1979 to join the staff of the Shreveport City Attorney's office. After Leach was unseated in 1980 by Buddy Roemer of Bossier City, McCrery was hired as district manager and later legislative director for Representative Roemer. In 1984, McCrery returned to Louisiana to work for Georgia Pacific Corporation, a forest products company. He remained there until his election to Congress four years later.

Congressional career
After Roemer resigned from Congress to become governor, McCrery ran for his former boss's seat as a Republican.

McCrery emerged from the special election in a runoff with Democratic State Senator Foster L. Campbell Jr. of Elm Grove, near Bossier City. A third contender, Shreveport journalist and then public relations representative Stanley R. Tiner, a Democrat, was eliminated in the first round of voting. McCrery became only the sixth Republican to represent Louisiana in the House since the end of Reconstruction. He was the first Republican in the Fourth District seat since George Luke Smith was unseated in 1874. In his bid for a full term in 1988, McCrery handily defeated Adeline McDade Roemer (1923-2016), the wife of businessman and political operative Charles E. Roemer II, and the Democratic mother of McCrery's former benefactor, Buddy Roemer.

In 1992, Louisiana lost a district as a result of sluggish population growth during the 1980s. Also, the state was ordered, temporarily, to draw a second black-majority district by the Justice Department. The legislature responded by shifting most of Shreveport and Bossier City's black voters into a new 4th District that stretched in roughly a "Z" shape all the way to Baton Rouge. Most of McCrery's former territory was merged with the 5th District, represented by 16-year incumbent Democrat Jerry Huckaby, who is now retired in Lincoln Parish. On paper, McCrery was in serious danger, since Huckaby retained nearly all of his former territory. However, the new Fifth was significantly more urbanized than its predecessor because of the presence of Shreveport.   McCrery retained 55 percent of his former constituents.  Also, since the new 4th had absorbed most of the old 5th's blacks as well, the new 5th District was only 16 percent African American; the old 5th was 30 percent black. McCrery was thus such a heavy favorite that national Democratic leaders wrote off the seat as a loss and urged Huckaby to retire. Huckaby chose to stay in the race and was heavily defeated, carrying only one parish in the district. McCrery thus became the first Louisiana Republican to unseat a Democratic incumbent at the federal level.

McCrery was reelected seven more times with no substantive opposition and was completely unopposed in 1996, 1998, and 2004. His district was renumbered as the 4th again in 1997, after the United States Supreme Court ruled the 4th was an unconstitutional racial gerrymander.

In the mid-term election of 2006, McCrery defeated Democratic challengers Patti Cox and Artis Cash and Republican Chester T. "Catfish" Kelley.

From 2007 to 2009, McCrery was the ranking Republican on the House Ways and Means Committee.

In 2007, in the early stages of the campaign for the Republican presidential nomination for 2008, McCrery announced his endorsement of candidate Mitt Romney, the former governor of Massachusetts for the party's nomination, a designation Romney won in 2012, not 2008.

On December 7, 2007, McCrery announced his decision not to seek reelection in 2008. Closed primaries were held by both parties in the fall of 2008 to begin the process of choosing a successor to McCrery. In the Republican primary, physician John C. Fleming of Minden in Webster Parish, beat McCrery's preferred successor, Jeff R. Thompson, a Bossier City attorney. After Fleming won the Republican nomination, McCrery endorsed him in an appearance on The Moon Griffon Show, a syndicated radio program based in Monroe. In the general election held on December 6, Fleming narrowly defeated the outgoing Caddo Parish District Attorney Paul J. Carmouche, a Democrat from Shreveport. Thompson would go on to be elected to the Louisiana House of Representatives in 2011.

Subcommittees and laws
Congressman McCrery sat on the following House Ways and Means subcommittees:
 Health Select Revenue Measures (Chairman)
 Human Resources
 Social Security (chairman)

McCrery sponsored or cosponsored six public bills in the 109th Congress that have been signed into law by the president, all of which involved disaster mitigation and assistance in response to 2005 hurricanes Katrina, Rita, and Wilma.

Post-Congressional career
In January 2009, McCrery joined a top lobbying firm, Capitol Counsel in Washington, D.C.
He is the lead Republican in the company. Among his clients is General Electric.

Family and personal life
On August 3, 1991, McCrery married the former Mary Johnette Hawkins (born December 1966), a Republican, a former television newswoman and communications specialist from Shreveport. The couple has two sons, Scott and Otis McCrery. The McCrerys subsequently divorced.

McCrery is a United Methodist.

In August 2014, Governor Bobby Jindal, who once worked as a summer intern on McCrery's congressional staff, appointed McCrery to fill the vacancy created by the resignation of John George, a Shreveport physician, to the influential Louisiana State University Board of Supervisors.

Political controversies

Chinese vice-premier gaffe
During the China–U.S trade talks of March 2007, McCrery and New York Democrat Charles Rangel committed a gaffe when they accidentally insulted Chinese Vice Premier Wu Yi by referring to her as the Vice Premier of the "Republic of China" in a letter. The Republic of China is a name for the self-ruling government on the island of Taiwan, which the PRC considers a rogue province.

References

External links
 
 
 Profile at SourceWatch
 Election Central Guide to 2008

|-

|-

|-

|-

1949 births
20th-century Methodists
21st-century American politicians
21st-century Methodists
American United Methodists
Living people
Louisiana lawyers
Louisiana State University Law Center alumni
Louisiana Tech University alumni
People from Leesville, Louisiana
Politicians from Shreveport, Louisiana
Republican Party members of the United States House of Representatives from Louisiana
United States congressional aides
Members of Congress who became lobbyists